Fazli may refer to:

Given name
 Fazli (poet) ( 1543–1605), Azerbaijani poet
 Fazli Husain (1877–1936), Pakistani politician
 Fazlı Teoman Yakupoğlu, Turkish rock singer

Surname
 Fereydoon Fazli, Iranian footballer
 Nida Fazli, Indian lyricist
 Samir Fazli, Albanian-Macedonian footballer
 Osman Fazli, Turkish Sufi

Other uses
 Fazli (mango), a mango cultivar

Arabic masculine given names
Turkish masculine given names